Sucha Góra  is a village in the administrative district of Gmina Suchowola, within Sokółka County, Podlaskie Voivodeship, in north-eastern Poland.

References

I'm from Sucha Gora left the beautiful (to me) village & people in 4/20/62, we spoke a language of our own, we called it "po prostu" rough translation it means talking straight.A very blunt language.

Villages in Sokółka County